Guide: "The Way to Freedom and Truth" is published bi-monthly by the religious organization Kingdom of Jesus Christ, The Name Above Every Name. ACQ Publication Editorial Office (ACQ Tri-Media Publishing) is located at Philippine-Japan Friendship Highway, Catitipan, Davao City.

References

Sonshine Media Network International
Bi-monthly magazines
Magazines with year of establishment missing
Magazines published in Metro Manila
Religious magazines
Magazines published in the Philippines